Litch may refer to:

People
 Betty Litch (1941–1994), wife of Richard Butler (white supremacist)
 Debbie Litch, theatre director of the Memphis, Tennessee, USA, theater, Theatre Memphis
 Ernest W. Litch Jr. (1897–1967), a U.S. Navy vice admiral
 John Tilton Litch, Massachusetts state representative during the 1923–1924 Massachusetts legislature
 Josiah Litch (1809–1886), U.S. Methodist preacher of New England

Characters
 Mr. Litch, a fictional character from Diary of a Wimpy Kid: The Last Straw

Places
 Litch, Georgia, USA; a locality in Greene County

Other uses
 "The Litch", an episode of the TV show Conversations in L.A.

See also

 Lychgate or litchgate

 Litchfield (disambiguation)
 Lichfield (disambiguation)
 Lich (disambiguation)